The General Post Office in St. Martin's Le Grand (later known as GPO East) was the main post office for London between 1829 and 1910, the headquarters of the General Post Office of the United Kingdom of Great Britain and Ireland, and England's first purpose-built post office. It was demolished in 1912.

History
Originally known as the General Letter Office, the headquarters for the General Post Office (GPO) was built on the eastern side of St. Martin's Le Grand in the City of London between 1825 and 1829, to designs by Robert Smirke.
 

This was the UK's second purpose-built post office. Dublin's GPO, completed in 1818 to a design by Francis Johnston, and still in use, predates it. The building's main facade had a central hexastyle Greek Ionic portico with pediment, and two tetrastyle porticoes without pediments at each end. The main interior was the large letter-carriers' room, with its elegant iron gallery and spiral staircase.

While externally attractive, however, the building suffered from internal shortcomings. Poor layout meant that work requiring bright light was conducted in poorly illuminated areas; odours spread from the lavatories to the kitchens, while the combination of gas lighting and poor ventilation meant that workers often felt nauseous. The expansion of the work of the Post Office also meant that by the later 19th century it was occupied well beyond its intended capacity; The Times reported in 1860 that "rooms have been overcrowded, closets turned into offices, extra rooms hung by tie rods to the girders of the ceiling".

From 1868, the GPO experimented with the services of the London Pneumatic Despatch Company, which operated a pneumatic tube from Euston railway station for the delivery of mail, but the experiment was unsuccessful and terminated in 1874.

Expansion

In the 1870s a new building was added on the western side of St. Martin's Le Grand to house the telegraph department, and the GPO North was constructed immediately to the north of the telegraph building in the 1890s as the GPO continued to expand. To avoid confusion, the original General Post Office was renamed GPO East.

When the Central London Railway was constructed in 1900, a nearby station was named Post Office (now called St Paul's). The original Smirke building was closed in 1910 and demolished in 1912. BT Centre, a post-Second World War building and the current headquarters of BT Group, now stands on the site of the old telegraph office.

The only fragment that survives is the Ionic capital from the right-hand side of the portico. This five-ton piece was presented to Walthamstow Urban District Council and is sited in Vestry Road.

See also
Tibs the Great

References

External link

Postal history of the United Kingdom
Postal system of the United Kingdom
1827 establishments in the United Kingdom
1912 disestablishments in England
Former buildings and structures in the City of London
Demolished buildings and structures in London
Buildings and structures demolished in 1912
London
Infrastructure in London
Post office buildings in the United Kingdom